Sheffield United Football Club (known as the Blades) participated in League One, the third level of English football for the first time in 23 years having been relegated from the Championship at the end of the previous season. It was also their first appearance in both the Football League Trophy and the first round proper of the FA Cup for a similar length of time, as well as being the first season under new manager Danny Wilson. United began the season well, recording consistently sound results in Football League One and nearing the position required for an immediate return to the Championship. By the turn of the year, the squad was well positioned for promotion.

Reasonable progress was made in the cup competitions, reaching the second round of the League Cup, the fourth round of the FA Cup and the regional quarter finals of the Football League Trophy. With only a handful of games left to play in the league United looked set to finish in second place in the table, but in the aftermath of leading scorer Ched Evans being jailed, results declined, and United slipped to third place in the final week of the season.  Although they reached the play-off final, the team were beaten on penalties by Huddersfield Town at Wembley Stadium, thus failing to achieve promotion and being destined to spend the following season in League One.

Team kit
The team kit for the 2011–12 season was produced by Macron for the third successive year. The home kit consisted of the club's traditional red and white stripes and was based on the kit worn by the team in the early 1970s, chosen following a poll of fans the previous year.  As the pre-season programme got under way the club also revealed a new all yellow away kit.  By mid July the club announced that they had struck a joint sponsorship deal with cross-city rivals Sheffield Wednesday which would see both teams sponsored by the same two local companies. The Blades' home kit was sponsored by Westfield Health and the away kit by local car dealers Gilders Group (with Sheffield Wednesday's kit's having the reverse).  The club later announced that a new secondary sponsor, Nexis, would appear on the back of the home shirts for the coming season.

Season overview

Preseason

Following relegation from the Championship at the end of the previous season, company chairman Kevin McCabe sacked manager Micky Adams, insisting that the club needed a new start to take them forward.  After a few weeks of speculation, McCabe appointed former Sheffield Wednesday manager Danny Wilson as Adams' successor. Wilson began to assemble his back room team, appointing former United defender Frank Barlow as his number two, fellow former Blade Billy Dearden as chief scout and Dave Morrison as fitness coach.

Wilson stressed that he intended to bring a better style of play to the team in the coming season but admitted that players would have to be sold to balance the books. Deals were already in place to sell Jamie Ward to Derby County for an undisclosed fee, and sign Danny Philliskirk from Chelsea on a free transfer, but Wilson also added to the squad in June by signing Lecsinel Jean-François from his former club Swindon Town, also on a free transfer. After much speculation, and with the players about to return for pre-season training, Darius Henderson was sold to Millwall for an undisclosed fee in order to free up money on the wage bill.

The club announced a low-key series of friendlies for July, while Wilson continued to reshape his squad, allowing young defenders Kingsley James and Phil Roe, both products of the Blades Academy, to leave and rejoin former boss Micky Adams at Port Vale on free transfers.  A youthful team were held to a draw by Sheffield but overcame Worksop Town a few days later. With the team about to leave for a training camp in Malta, Mark Yeates was sold to Watford for an undisclosed fee, Ryan Flynn was signed from Falkirk for a similarly undisclosed fee and Chris Porter arrived on a free transfer having been released by Derby County.  Once in Malta, United took on local sides Sliema Wanderers and Hibernians in friendly games, beating both sides. Upon returning to England, the Blades completed their pre-season schedule with two home fixtures, losing to Doncaster Rovers and drawing with Blackpool.  With their pre-season schedule completed the Blades signed young winger Nathaniel Mendez-Laing from Wolverhampton Wanderers on a six-month loan deal.

Unfortunately, the latter half of July also saw the club hit the national headlines for the wrong reasons. Firstly, the club was identified by a Channel 4 undercover investigation as being offered for sale as part of an illegal ownership deal, although the Blades themselves were not implicated in any wrongdoing. A fortnight later, striker Ched Evans was arrested and charged with rape following an incident in May.

August–September: Early season optimism

The Blades won the opening game of the season away from home, outclassing Oldham Athletic, but a strong side needed penalties to overcome Hartlepool United at Victoria Park in the first round of the League Cup a few days later. Midfielder Kevin McDonald was added to the squad on a free transfer after a lengthy trial period, before the Blades resumed their league campaign, beating Brentford at home, and overturning a two-nil deficit to overcome Walsall at Bramall Lane.  Having spent the previous season on loan at United, Argentinian Elian Parrino returned to South Yorkshire on a one-year deal from Estudiantes de La Plata, after which the Blades embarked on a four match run of away games in the space of eleven days.  They dropped their first league points of the season as they were held to a draw by Tranmere Rovers, before suffering their first defeat of the season on a quick return to Merseyside, allowing the lead to slip once more as they crashed out of the League Cup at the hands of Premiership Everton.  The team returned to league action and winning ways with an away trip to Yeovil, the first ever competitive meeting between the two clubs, after which they despatched Burton Albion to progress into the second round of the Football League Trophy.

With Danny Wilson still needing to raise money and trim the wage bill, the Blades had a relatively busy transfer deadline day, allowing Jordan Slew to join Blackburn Rovers for £1.1m, and Daniel Bogdanović to join Blackpool for an undisclosed fee, but turning down another offer from the Seasiders for Stephen Quinn.  The Blades also agreed a deal to take two young midfielders, John Fleck and Kyle Hutton, on loan from Rangers for the remainder of the season, but the deal subsequently fell through due to issues with the paperwork involved.  The team kicked off September by crushing Bury 4–0 at Bramall Lane, and then travelled to Scunthorpe United where they maintained their unbeaten start after coming from behind to grab a 1–1 draw.  Off the field the restructuring of the club continued with the appointment of former Blades player Julian Winter as Chief Executive to replace the departing Trevor Birch.  Danny Wilson added to his defensive options by signing Marcus Williams on a months loan from Reading, with the defender making his début only hours later, although he was unable to prevent the Blades from crashing to their first league defeat of the season as they were trounced 3–0 at home by Huddersfield Town.  Despite this setback the Blades quickly returned to winning ways, reversing the previous scoreline to crush Colchester United 3–0 at Bramall Lane.  The month ended on a low note however as the team suffered a shock defeat at struggling Wycombe Wanderers, although they still managed to hold onto second place in the table.

October–November: Important points dropped
October started no better for the Blades as they were easily beaten 2–0 at home by league leaders Charlton Athletic and needed a last second goal to progress in the Football League Trophy as they struggled against League Two side Rotherham United. Meanwhile, Danny Wilson boosted his squad ahead of the Steel City derby, with Marcus Williams agreeing to stay on loan for a further two months and Matt Phillips and Billy Clarke arriving for a month each from Blackpool. The new arrivals failed to halt the disappointing run of results however as the Blades let a 2–0 lead slip to end up drawing with their cross–city rivals.  Despite this disappointment the team bounced back to score an emphatic away win at Preston a few days later with both new signing Matt Phillips and old hand Lee Williamson netting two goals apiece.  With increased competition for first team places, youngsters Danny Philliskirk and Corey Gregory were allowed to go out on loan to Oxford United and Hucknall Town respectively; swiftly followed by Connor Brown who joined Eastwood Town on a months deal.  Back in the league, the disappointing results continued as United threw away a lead once again, allowing ten-men Leyton Orient to snatch a draw with the last kick of the game.  Once again the Blades quickly responded to the setback by beating fellow promotion rivals MK Dons 2–1 at Bramall Lane, but then conspired to throw away yet more points, allowing Exeter City to come from behind twice in the closing minutes of the next game to snatch a 4–4 draw.

Into November and back on the road, yet another late goal was handed Stevenage all three points, leaving United fifth in the table going into FA Cup week.  With Phillips and Clarke playing the final game of their loan spell, United tamely exited the Football League Trophy, losing on penalties to League Two strugglers Bradford City.  There was a more positive result in the FA Cup however as a brace from Ched Evans helped the Blades ease past Oxford United.  By mid–November, and with Danny Wilson still seeking to add to his attacking options, it was reported that former striker and fans favourite James Beattie had returned to training  with the club and could be handed a contract depending on match fitness, and a short term deal was duly signed a few days later.  Back in League action United saw out a victory over Carlisle United despite seeing a Richard Cresswell spot–kick saved in the second half, and a week later Ched Evans scored his fifth goal in four games to beat Chesterfield by the same scoreline.  The month ended on a sombre note however as former player and manager Gary Speed was found dead at his home after having taken his own life less than a year after leaving his post at Bramall Lane.

December–January: Maximum points for Christmas

December started with the second round of the FA Cup and despite conceding another late goal, the Blades progressed into the third round at the expense of Torquay United, thanks to another brace from in Ched Evans, who then scored for the fifth game in succession in the next game, netting twice more in a league victory over Rochdale.  The team's impressive form continued with an away win at Bourenmouth thanks to two own goals, Notts County making a similar gift of an own goal to contribute to their own defeat on Boxing Day, before the Blades rounded the year off by crushing Hartlepool United on New Year's Eve; meaning that the Blades ended 2011 in second place in the table following eight victories in a row in all competitions.

With the transfer window reopening in January, Danny Wilson's first signing was the return of former loan player Marcus Williams who agreed a two and a half year deal.  The New Year started disappointingly as the Blades crashed to their first defeat since the beginning of November as they were beaten 3–2 at Carlisle United. Following Danny Wilson being awarded 'League One Manager of the Month' for December, United soon got back to winning ways when they returned to home soil.  The team saw off Salisbury City 3–1 in the third round of the FA Cup, the first meeting ever between the two clubs, and then outclassed Yeovil Town a few days later, hitting four without reply including a brace from Lee Williamson and a first ever club goal from captain Michael Doyle. With Danny Wilson looking to freshen up his squad United rewarded four of its younger players with contract extensions, with Erik Tønne and David McAllister set to remain with the club until the summer of 2014, and youth team players Jordan Chapell and Jack Adams agreeing new deals until the end of the season. In a busy day the club saw the departure of Elian Parrino as his short term deal came to an end, and then allowed McAllister to join League Two club Shrewsbury Town on a months loan, with manager Danny Wilson bemoaning a lack of reserve games under the current system.  The following week Wilson continued to overhaul the squad with reserve keeper Mihkel Aksalu leaving the club on mutual terms, but was boosted by 'fans favourite' James Beattie agreeing a deal to remain at Bramall Lane until the end of the season. Meanwhile, back in the league the Blades then continued their fine run of form, completing their second league double of the week, as they hit three without reply away at Bury, but that form deserted them for a top-of-the-table trip to Charlton Athletic where a bad tempered match resulted in both teams being reduced to ten men and a 1–0 loss for United.  Seven days later United suffered their first back-to-back defeats of the season as they crashed out of the FA Cup at the hands of Birmingham City. With the transfer window about to close Bramall Lane was relatively quite on deadline day; Danny Philliskirk was handed an extended deal, and striker Will Hoskins signed on loan from Brighton & Hove Albion until the end of the season, whilst youngster Erik Tønne was allowed to join Yorkshire neighbours York City, also until the end of the season. The club also gave a trial to experienced Scottish defender David Weir with a view to a potential short term contract.

February–March: Promotion charge takes shape then falls apart

After various match postponements due to a spell of bad weather and the various cup competitions United finally returned to league action in mid February with new signing Hoskins scoring on his début as the Blades ran out 3–0 victors over Wycombe Wanderers. After a successful spell, midfielder David McAllister opted to extend his loan deal at Shrewsbury until the end of March, whilst young keeper George Long agreed a new long–term deal at Bramall Lane.  Meanwhile, on Valentine's Day, the Blades beat Yorkshire and promotion rivals Huddersfield Town 1–0 at the Galpharm Stadium as defender Neill Collins scored his first ever goal for the club, before coming from behind to beat Preston North End at home a few days later, despite Ched Evans missing a penalty. With Mihkel Aksalu having departed, United agreed a two and a half year deal with keeper, and free agent, Mark Howard to provide cover for Steve Simonsen, before the club met their cross-city rivals in the second Steel City derby of the season where United suffered a narrow defeat.  Looking for a quick bounce–back, United were forced to come from behind to beat Scunthorpe United at home, to leave them in second place, five points clear of third, in the table at the start of March.

Despite their form, United suffered a catastrophic start to March as they lost at home to Oldham Athletic having had a two-goal lead only to see both Matthew Lowton and Harry Maguire sent off and the team subsequently collapse.  With the entire back four unavailable, United were forced to draft in Matt Hill and John Egan on emergency loans, but this was not enough to prevent them slipping to their third defeat in four games as they capitulated at Walsall.  Danny Wilson remained keen to find first team experience for the younger members of the squad and as such allowed Seamus Conneely to join Alfreton Town on loan before United returned to winning ways with two goals from Ched Evans being enough to defeat Brentford at Griffin Park.  Unfortunately the Blades failed to take advantage of their game in hand, being held to a draw by Colchester United, before once again allowing a lead to slip as they drew with Tranmere Rovers at Bramall Lane. With the transfer deadline for loans approaching, the Blades' longest serving player and vice-captain Nick Montgomery was allowed to join Millwall until the end of the season due to an absence of first team football, allowing Danny Wilson to bring in winger Michael O'Halloran on loan from Bolton Wanderers.  Meanwhile, on the pitch, United put their recent poor form behind them as they outclassed Notts County 5–2 at Meadow Lane, before putting four goals past Chesterfield at Bramall Lane, including a hat–trick from in–form striker Ched Evans.  Despite a low–key team performance, a second Ched Evans penalty in as many games was enough to finish the month with a third straight victory, with the Blades defeating Hartlepool United at Victoria Park.

April–May: The final straight ends in disappointment
With loan defender John Egan returning to his parent club at the start of April, Nick Montgomery's loan at Millwall was all but cut short after only two substitute appearances when he sustained a calf injury likely to sideline him until the end of the season. David McAllister also saw his loan spell at Shrewsbury cut short shortly after receiving a red card, with the resulting three game ban ruling him out for the remainder of his time at the New Meadow.  Back in the league a nervy display saw the Blades edge out Bournemouth at Bramall Lane, before a much more emphatic performance saw them bury Rochdale at the Spotland Stadium.  With the Blades now in a straight fight with local rivals Sheffield Wednesday for the second automatic promotion spot they came from behind to beat Leyton Orient at Bramall Lane to open up a four-point gap on third placed Wednesday.  The next week however their campaign was dealt a crushing blow as star striker and top scorer Ched Evans's case came to trial where he was found guilty of rape and sentenced to five years in prison.  Without Evans and missing his injured strike partner Richard Cresswell, United slipped to a damaging defeat at MK Dons.  Worse was to come as United could only register a draw with Stevenage in a dramatic final home game at Bramall Lane, meaning they slipped out of the automatic promotion places for the first time since February.  United went into the final league fixture with Exeter City requiring to win and hope that rivals Sheffield Wednesday were beaten to secure promotion; a combination that failed to materialise as Wednesday registered a victory and the Blades could only draw meaning they were consigned to the play-offs.

Another trip to Wembley

With James Beattie unavailable for the playoffs following a red card in the final game of the season against Exeter City, manager Danny Wilson was faced with a selection crisis ahead of the critical games against Stevenage.  With only one senior striker available a patched up side contested a dour first-leg where neither team created many chances.  United did manage to keep a clean sheet however and took the tie back to Bramall Lane with the scores level at 0–0.

The Blades entered the second leg still bereft of forwards, with Richard Cresswell having contracted an illness on the morning of the game, so were forced to play with just Chris Porter as a lone striker once more.  An even first half saw few opportunities for either side but following the break United began to attack with more purpose.  Despite chances for both sides the game looked to be heading for another draw until Porter scored an 85th-minute winner to put the Blades through to the final at Wembley.

Richard Cresswell was passed fit for the final against Huddersfield but influential midfielder Kevin McDonald was left out through injury so the Blades were forced to make changes once more.  The game was played under blistering heat and neither side created many chances. It remained 0–0 after ninety minutes and so extra–time was played but there was still no breakthrough.  Ultimately the game went to penalties, which saw every player for both sides take a spot kick only for United to lose 8–7 when goalkeeper Steve Simonsen missed the final kick, consigning the Blades to another season in League One.

Academy and Reserve teams

Reserves
Sheffield United Reserves played in the Central League: Central Division in the nearby Derbyshire town of Dronfield at the Coach and Horses ground, which was also the home of Sheffield FC during the season. Experienced defender Chris Morgan was appointed reserve team coach at the start of the season and given the responsibility of developing the young players which made up the bulk of the side.  With many teams now opting not to enter a reserve side into an organised competition the Central Division consisted of just seven sides meaning fixtures were irregular throughout the season.  In January 2012 Danny Wilson expressed the need to reform the reserve team structure due to this infrequent number of matches citing that experienced players do not gain much from them and the cost of staging the fixtures as issues.

Despite this United's side ended the season as Champions, finishing one point ahead of nearest rivals Derby County who had won the division in the previous season, ironically by one point from The Blades who had finished second.  Following a nine match unbeaten run the title was clinched with the final game of the season as United held a strong Nottingham Forest side to a 1–1 draw at the coach and Horses ground.  Danny Philliskirk ended the season as top scorer, having netted six goals, whilst he was also the joint leading appearance maker along with Matty Harriott and Shane Murray.

Academy
Sheffield United Academy U18s played in the FA Premier Academy League U18s Group D at the Shirecliffe ground at Firshill Crescent.  Under the management of John Pemberton, the side were seeking to replicate the success of the previous season when they had reached the final of the FA Youth Cup final.  Shorn of a number of key players (who had either graduated to the first team or left the club), the team completed a solid but unspectacular season.  Results fluctuated with impressive victories over the likes of Everton, Bolton and Sunderland being mixed with heavy defeats to Leeds United, Coventry City and West Ham United.  Eventually finishing fifth (out of ten teams) in their division, manager John Pemberton described the season as "another successful one for everyone associated with the Academy. We have five players becoming professionals who will all be linking up with the first team next season and that is what we are judged on – producing players."

United's hopes of repeating the previous season's success in the FA Youth Cup did not come to fruition however.  After a victory in the first round over Tranmere Rovers, they required penalties to see off Port Vale in the next round before finally being eliminated in round three when Southampton recorded a 7–0 victory over the Blades.

Players

First-team squad
Squad at end of season

Out on loan

Left club during season

Transfers and contracts

In

Summer

Winter

Loan in

Out

Summer

Winter

Loan out

Contracts
New contracts and contract extensions.

League table

Season firsts

Player début
Players making their first team Sheffield United début in a fully competitive match.

Début goal
Players scoring their first goal for Sheffield United in a competitive fixture.

Competitive fixture
First ever meeting of the two clubs in a competitive fixture.

Stadia
First ever visit to a stadium for a competitive fixture

Squad statistics

Appearances and goals

|-
|colspan="16"|Players who left before the end of the season:

|}

Top scorers

Disciplinary record

Suspensions

International Call-ups

Matches

Key

Football League One

Playoffs

FA Cup

Football League Cup

Football League Trophy

Pre–season and friendlies

Honours and awards

PFA League One Team of the Year
Ched Evans
Harry Maguire
Stephen Quinn

League One Manager of the Month
December: Danny Wilson

League One Player of the Month
March: Ched Evans

Football League Young Player of the Month
August: Harry Maguire

Sheffield Star Young Player of the Year
Harry Maguire

League One Team of the Week

 6/7 August: Stephen Quinn, Harry Maguire
 27/28 August: Stephen Quinn
 3/4 September: Neill Collins, Chris Porter, Stephen Quinn
 17/18 September: Michael Doyle
 15/16 October: Lee Williamson
 29/30 October: Matt Phillips
 19/20 November: Matthew Lowton
 25/26 November: Matthew Lowton

 10/11 December: Ched Evans, Matthew Lowton
 15/16 January: Richard Cresswell, Stephen Quinn, Steve Simonsen
 11/12 February: Ched Evans, Matthew Lowton, Kevin McDonald
 18/19 February: Ched Evans, Lecsinel Jean-François
 10/11 March: Matt Hill
 31 March / 1 April: Ched Evans, Harry Maguire
 14/15 April: Ched Evans, Lee Williamson

Fans Player of the Month

 August: Stephen Quinn
 September: Neill Collins
 October: Ched Evans
 November: Ched Evans
 December: Ched Evans

 January: Kevin McDonald
 February: Steve Simonsen
 March: Ched Evans
 April: Lee Williamson

Club end-of-season awards
 Player of the Year:  Harry Maguire
 Young Player of the Year: Harry Maguire
 Goal of the Season: Nick Montgomery (vs. Tranmere Rovers)

References

Notes

External links
 Sheffield United F.C. Official Website

Sheffield United F.C. seasons
Sheffield United